Avihai (lit. My father lives), sometimes spelled Avichai, is a Hebrew name generally found in Israel. It may refer to:

People
 Avichai Mandelblit (1963–), an Israeli jurist
 Avichai Rontzki (1951–2018), an Israeli rabbi
 Avihai Yadin (1986–), an Israeli footballer

Fictional characters
 Avihai, a character in the TV show Fauda